In mathematics, Ribet's lemma gives conditions for a subgroup of a product of groups to be the whole product group.

Statement

Suppose G1×...×Gn is a product of perfect groups. Then any subgroup of this product that maps onto all the factors Gi for i=1, ..., n is the whole product group.

References

Theorems in group theory